Roberta Rogow (born March 7, 1942) is an American writer of speculative fiction and fan fiction, and a filk singer-songwriter. SHe graduated with a BA from Queens CUNY in 1962 and Columbia University with an MLS in 1971.

Career

Rogow is a children's librarian by profession.  She started her writing career as the editor of Grip, a media-based fanzine, 1978–1996.

She has written several mystery novels based on a(n imaginary) collaboration between Arthur Conan Doyle and Lewis Carroll.  She has also penned a number of short stories, including contributions to the shared world science fiction series Merovingen Nights.

Critical Acclaim
In a review of The Problem of the Surly Student, Publisher's Weekly stated that "In clear, sometimes lyrical prose, the author paints an engaging and palpable picture of Victorian Oxford with its complex society of dons, undergraduates, scouts and townspeople. Rogow is particularly good at dramatizing the status of women as university students." About the same book, Kirkus Review stated "Rogow provides an interesting look at the manners and mores of the academic world of the Victorians."

S. Malkah Cohen in reviewing Murders in Manatas states: "Ms Rogow has carefully thought thru the many twists and turns that politics, language, religion and more would have taken if the Moors had taken hold of more of southern Europe and became a major world power."

Tim Lieder notes that Roberta writes likeable characters with enjoyable plot contrivances.

Filking

As a filksinger, she has appeared at science fiction conventions, mostly in the Northeast United States, including Albacon.  She has also appeared internationally, at Torcon 3.

Rogow has characterized her filk tapes as "electronic fanzines" that reach about 2,000 people.

Roberta was inducted into the Filk Hall of Fame on April 20, 2013.

Roberta has recorded 8 filk tapes and 5 CDs, some of which were self-published. Her current music publisher is Floating Filk Studios.

She has also published 18 songbooks called "Rec-Room Rhymes".

Personal
Rogow lived in Fair Lawn, New Jersey from 1972 to 2002. Since 2002, she has lived in Irvington, New Jersey.

Works
Books & Stories

 

Filk CDs

References

External links
author info at Books-n-Bytes 
Current CD publisher for Roberta

Roberta's Bandcamp Page

21st-century American novelists
American science fiction writers
American women short story writers
American women novelists
Filkers
1942 births
Living people
Women science fiction and fantasy writers
21st-century American women writers
People from Fair Lawn, New Jersey
People from Irvington, New Jersey
21st-century American short story writers